Libuše Friedrichová-Veselá (3 October 1900 – 12 August 1973) was a Czech figure skater. She competed in the mixed pairs event at the 1928 Winter Olympics, along with husband Vojtěch Veselý.

References

External links
 

1900 births
1973 deaths
Czech female pair skaters
Olympic figure skaters of Czechoslovakia
Figure skaters at the 1928 Winter Olympics
People from Hradec Králové District
Sportspeople from the Hradec Králové Region